Tzadik Records is a record label in New York City that specializes in avant-garde and experimental music. The label was established by composer and saxophonist John Zorn in 1995. He is the executive producer of all Tzadik releases. Tzadik is a not-for-profit, cooperative record label.

Tzadik has released over 400 albums by a variety of artists with diverse musical backgrounds, including free improvisation, jazz, noise, klezmer, rock, and experimental composition.

On the label's catalogue are releases by Zorn himself and his multifaceted "songbook" group Masada; singer Mike Patton; guitarists Derek Bailey, Yoshihide Otomo, Tim Sparks, Buckethead and Keiji Haino; noise music icon Merzbow; composers Gordon Mumma, Frank Denyer, Arnold Dreyblatt, and Teiji Ito; experimental groups Kayo Dot, Time of Orchids and Rashanim, microtonalists Syzygys; drummer Tatsuya Yoshida and his bands Ruins and Korekyojinn; trumpeter Wadada Leo Smith; electroacoustic composer Noah Creshevsky; and jazz saxophonist Steve Coleman.

Roster

References

External links
 Official site

 
Record labels established in 1995
Jazz record labels
American independent record labels
Experimental music record labels
Noise music record labels
John Zorn
Progressive rock record labels
Jewish rock
Jews and Judaism in New York City